The Shrine of Saint Mary the Crowned of Carmel, also called Shrine of Our Lady of the Hens, is a Roman Catholic Marian shrine located in Pagani, Campania, annually hosting the feast of Our Lady of the Hens.

See also
 Shrines to the Virgin Mary
 Catholic Marian church buildings

References

External links 
 
 
 
 
 
 

Our Lady of Mount Carmel
Shrines to the Virgin Mary
Roman Catholic churches completed in 1615
1615 establishments in Italy
Churches in the province of Salerno
Baroque architecture in Campania
17th-century Roman Catholic church buildings in Italy